Members of the British Liberal Party's Frontbench Team from 1976 to 1988 (leaderships listed chronologically):

Party Spokesmen under David Steel's First Parliament July 1976–April 1977
David Steel: Party Leader
John Pardoe: Deputy Leader and Chief Treasury Spokesman
Jeremy Thorpe: Foreign Affairs
Emlyn Hooson: Home Affairs
Cyril Smith: Chief Whip
Clement Freud: Northern Ireland Spokesman
Lord Kimberley: Aviation Spokesman

Party Spokesmen under David Steel's First Parliament April 1977–May 1979
David Steel: Party Leader
John Pardoe: Deputy Leader and Chief Treasury Spokesman
Jeremy Thorpe: Foreign Affairs
Cyril Smith: Employment
Alan Beith: Chief Whip
Clement Freud: Northern Ireland, Broadcasting and the Arts
Lord Kimberley: Aviation Spokesman

Liberal Party (UK)
20th century in the United Kingdom
1976 establishments in the United Kingdom
1988 disestablishments